Timo Mehlich (born 12 August 1997) is a German footballer who plays as a midfielder for SSVg Velbert.

Career

Youth 
Mehlich began playing with the Borussia Mönchengladbach academy in 2010, where he stayed until 2014. After been released from the Borussia academy, Melich joined Oberliga Niederrhein side 1. FC Mönchengladbach. Whilst with the team, he made six first team appearances, scoring two goals and tallying two assists.

College & PDL
In 2016, Mehlich moved to the United States to play college soccer at the University of Nevada, Las Vegas, where he played for four years.

While at college, Mehlich also appeared for USL PDL side OKC Energy U23 during their 2017 season.

Professional 
On 9 January 2020, Mehlich was selected 52nd overall in the 2020 MLS SuperDraft by Seattle Sounders FC. However, he instead opted to join USL Championship side Rio Grande Valley FC on 11 January 2020.

He made his professional debut on 8 March 2020, starting in a 5–1 loss to LA Galaxy II.

On 5 January 2021, Mehlich joined Regionalliga West side SV Straelen.

References

External links 
 Timo Mehlich - Men's Soccer UNLV bio
 
 

1997 births
Sportspeople from Mönchengladbach
Living people
German footballers
Association football midfielders
UNLV Rebels men's soccer players
Seattle Sounders FC draft picks
Rio Grande Valley FC Toros players
SV 19 Straelen players
SSVg Velbert players
USL Championship players
USL League Two players
Regionalliga players
Oberliga (football) players
Expatriate soccer players in the United States
German expatriate footballers
German expatriate sportspeople in the United States